The South Carolina National Guard (SCNG) consists of the South Carolina Army National Guard and the South Carolina Air National Guard.

History
The South Carolina National Guard, or Carolina militia as it was originally known, was born from the Carolina Charter of 1663. The charter gave to the Proprietors the right "to Leavy Mufter and Trayne all sortes of men of what Conditon or wherefoever borne in the said Province for the tyme being".

The state had the nation's last elected adjutant general. The adjutant general of South Carolina is presently appointed by the governor.

Dual missions, state and federal
American law specifically charges the National Guard with dual federal and state missions. In fact, the National Guard is the only United States military force empowered to function in a state status. Those functions range from limited actions during non-emergency situations to full scale law enforcement when called upon with the suspension of the Posse Comitatus Act, normally reserved for extreme situations when local law enforcement officials can no longer maintain civil control.

Federal mission
The National Guard may be called into federal service in response to a call by the President or Congress. When National Guard troops are called to federal service, the President serves as Commander-in-Chief. The federal mission assigned to the National Guard is: "To provide properly trained and equipped units for prompt mobilization for war, National emergency or as otherwise needed."

State mission
The Governor may call individuals or units of the South Carolina National Guard into state service during emergencies or to assist in special situations which lend themselves to use of the National Guard. The state mission assigned to the National Guard is: "To provide trained and disciplined forces for domestic emergencies or as otherwise provided by state law."

See also
 South Carolina Naval Militia
 South Carolina State Guard

References

External links

 
 Bibliography of South Carolina Army National Guard History compiled by the United States Army Center of Military History
 

1663 establishments in the British Empire
National Guard
Military units and formations established in 1663
National Guard
National Guard (United States)
National Guard
National Guard
National Guard
United States Army National Guard by state